Râușor is a rock-fill water dam build in 1987 in the far north of Argeș County, Romania. It impounds the Râul Târgului.

External links

Dams in Romania